Gymnopilus lateritius is a species of mushroom in the family Hymenogastraceae.

See also

List of Gymnopilus species

External links
Gymnopilus lateritius at Index Fungorum

lateritius
Fungi of North America